Joshua Edward Lowe (born February 2, 1998) is an American professional baseball outfielder for the Tampa Bay Rays of Major League Baseball (MLB). He made his MLB debut in 2021.

Amateur career
Lowe attended Pope High School in Marietta, Georgia. He played third base and was a pitcher. As a senior, he was the Gatorade Baseball Player of the Year for Georgia after hitting .391 with 11 home runs and 39 runs batted in (RBIs). He committed to play college baseball for the Florida State Seminoles.

Professional career
Lowe was selected by the Tampa Bay Rays with the 13th pick in the first round of the 2016 Major League Baseball draft. He signed and spent his first professional season with both the Gulf Coast League Rays and the Princeton Rays where he batted a combined .249 with five home runs and 26 RBIs in 54 total games between both teams. Lowe spent 2017 with the Bowling Green Hot Rods where he batted .268 with eight home runs, 55 RBIs, and 22 stolen bases in 118 games, and he spent 2018 with the Charlotte Stone Crabs where he hit .238 with six home runs, 47 RBIs, and 18 stolen bases in 105 games. Lowe has played exclusively as an outfielder since the start of 2017. He began 2019 with the Montgomery Biscuits. He was selected to play in the Arizona Fall League for the Salt River Rafters following the season.

On November 20, 2020, Lowe was added to the 40-man roster. He was assigned to the Triple-A Durham Bulls to begin the 2021 season. In 111 games for Durham, Lowe slashed .291/.381/.535 with 22 home runs, 78 RBI, and 26 stolen bases. Lowe was called up to the major leagues for the first time on September 8, 2021. In his debut, Lowe had a walk and a stolen base before collecting his first career hit, singling off of Boston Red Sox starter Nathan Eovaldi.

On April 30, 2022, Lowe hit his first career home run off of Dylan Bundy of the Minnesota Twins. He appeared in 52 games for the Rays in 2022, hitting .221/.284/.343 with 2 home runs and 13 RBI.

Personal life
His brother, Nathaniel Lowe, plays for the Texas Rangers. The two were teammates in Bowling Green before Nate was promoted to the High-A Charlotte Stone Crabs. His father, David, was drafted by the Seattle Mariners in the 1986 MLB Draft, but instead attended the U.S. Naval Academy and became a Naval Aviator and career fighter pilot in the U.S. Navy.

References

External links

1998 births
Living people
Baseball players from Marietta, Georgia
Major League Baseball outfielders
Tampa Bay Rays players
Gulf Coast Rays players
Princeton Rays players
Bowling Green Hot Rods players
Charlotte Stone Crabs players
Montgomery Biscuits players
Salt River Rafters players
Durham Bulls players